Hanna Emilie Mariën (born 16 May 1982) is a Belgian retired athlete and bobsledder. As a sprinter, Mariën specialized in the 200 metres and won gold in the 4×100 m relay at the 2008 Beijing Olympics. Mariën later became a bobsleigher, competing for Belgium at the 2014 Winter Olympics.

Athletics
Mariën reached the semi-final at the 2006 European Championships and won the bronze medal at the 2007 Summer Universiade. At the 2007 World Championships she won a bronze medal in the 4×100 m relay, together with teammates Olivia Borlée, Élodie Ouédraogo and Kim Gevaert. With 42.75 seconds the team set a new Belgian record.

At the 2008 Summer Olympics Mariën competed in the 4×100 m relay, together with Gevaert, Borlée and Ouédraogo. In their first round heat they placed first in front of Great Britain, Brazil and Nigeria. Their time of 42.92 seconds was the third time overall out of sixteen participating nations. With this result they qualified for the final in which they sprinted to a time of 42.54 seconds and the second place, 0.23 seconds behind Russia. In 2016, after Yuliya Chermoshanskaya's re-tested samples revealed two illegal substances, Russia was disqualified promoting Belgium to first place.  She was awarded the gold medal eight years late on September 10, 2016.

Bobsleighing
After retiring from athletics in 2012, Mariën turned to bobsleighing. With the national bobsleigh team, she participated at the 2014 Winter Olympics, where she and Elfje Willemsen ended sixth in the two woman bob.

References

External links

 
 Hanna Mariën at All-Athletics.com
 

1982 births
Living people
Belgian female sprinters
Olympic athletes of Belgium
Athletes (track and field) at the 2008 Summer Olympics
Olympic gold medalists for Belgium
People from Herentals
World Athletics Championships medalists
Belgian female bobsledders
Medalists at the 2008 Summer Olympics
Bobsledders at the 2014 Winter Olympics
Olympic bobsledders of Belgium
Olympic gold medalists in athletics (track and field)
Universiade medalists in athletics (track and field)
Universiade bronze medalists for Belgium
Medalists at the 2007 Summer Universiade
Olympic female sprinters
Sportspeople from Antwerp Province